Dr. Eugen Fischer (pseudonym: A. Helm), (3 March 1899, Berchtesgaden – 19 March 1973, Berchtesgaden) was a German geologist and historian. His pseudonym was created from the name of his wife Helma.

Literary works 
 Das Berchtesgadener Land im Wandel der Zeit 1929
 Die Literatur über das Berchtesgadener Land und seine Alpen 1930
 Moritz Mayer – ein Lebensbild der Heldin Judith Platter des Romans 'Zwei Menschen' von Richard Voss 1930, (with Magdalene Ziemke, second edition 1959)
 Hallthurm 1959

References
 Berchtesgaden im Wandel der Zeit - Ergänzungsband I, 1982, published by Hellmut Schöner on the basis of the 1929 book by A. Helm

1899 births
1973 deaths
German librarians
People from the Kingdom of Bavaria
German male non-fiction writers
20th-century German historians